The Taftan Tour was a professional cycling race held annually in Iran. It was part of UCI Asia Tour in category 2.2.

Winners

References

UCI Asia Tour races
Cycle races in Iran
Recurring sporting events established in 2007
Recurring sporting events disestablished in 2008
Defunct sports competitions in Iran
Defunct cycling races in Iran